Mikashevichy is a city in Brest Region, Belarus. It is located halfway between the cities of Brest and Gomel.

Polish–Soviet War
At the conclusion of World War I, Mikaszewicze held a special place in the political dialogue accompanying the Polish–Soviet War of liberation. The talks started in October 1919 at the small Mikaszewicze railway station and continued until December 1919. During the talks, Marshal Józef Piłsudski informed the Bolshevik delegation that Poland was not supporting the White movement of Anton Denikin in the Russian Civil War. The exchange of prisoners was decided there. However, the talks soon broke down. Already informed about Poland's intentions regarding the Lithuanian–Belorussian front, Bolshevik leaders began a progressive concentration of the Red forces on the interim border with Poland.

Sports and culture
The town is home to FC Granit Mikashevichi.

Famous people
Sviatlana Tsikhanouskaya

Notes

External links

 Granite pit
 

Cities in Belarus
Populated places in Brest Region
Mozyrsky Uyezd
Polesie Voivodeship